Valentino may refer to

People
 Valentino (surname), including a list of people with the name
 Valentino (given name), including a list of people with the name

Mononymous persons
 Valentino (fashion designer) (born Valentino Clemente Ludovico Garavani, 1932), Italian fashion designer
 Valentino (singer) (born Peter González Torres, 1980), Puerto Rican singer
 Valentino Fiévet (born 1991), French soccer player, known simply as Valentino
 Cesare Borgia (c. 1475–1507), sometimes called Valentino, Spanish-Italian soldier, nobleman, politician, and cardinal
 Valentino, disco singer who recorded the song "I Was Born This Way"

Places
 Valentino, Italian name for the duchy of Valentinois, now part of Valence, Drôme
 Castello del Valentino (Valentino Castle), a castle in Turin, Italy
 Parco del Valentino (Valentino Park), a public park in Turin, Italy

Companies and organizations
 Valentino Music, a Bosnian commercial cable television channel
 The Valentinos, a U.S. R&B group
 Lost Valentinos (formerly The Valentinos), Australian band
 Valentino (fashion house), clothing company founded by Valentino Garavani
 Valentino Fashion Group, corporate parent to the fashion house, that includes several brands and fashion houses
 Valentino's, a U.S. Italian-cuisine restaurant chain

Art and entertainment
 Valentino, a fictional character from the adult animated web series Hazbin Hotel ; see List of Hazbin Hotel and Helluva Boss characters

Film
 Valentino (1951 film), film billed as the life story of movie legend Rudolph Valentino
 Valentino (1977 film), film very loosely based on the life of Rudolph Valentino
 Valentino: The Last Emperor, 2009 documentary film about Valentino Garavani

Music
 Valentino (album), an album by the band Weeping Tile
 "Valentino" (24kGoldn song)
 "Valentino" (Years & Years and MNEK song)
 Valentino, an album by Scottish band Long Fin Killie
 "Valentino", song by Cadillac
 "Valentino", song by Diane Birch from Bible Belt
 "Valentino", song by Connie Francis
 "Valentino", song by 24kGoldn

Other
 Valentino nero, Italian wine grape variety from the Piedmont region

See also 

 Valentinos, Greek-language male given name
 Valentinois, Drome, France
 Duke of Valentinois
 Valentinov, Russian surname
 Valentinovka, Inzersky Selsoviet, Arkhangelsky District, Bashkortostan, Russia
 Valentinovo, Croatia
 
 Valentin (disambiguation)
 Valentina (disambiguation)
 Valentine (disambiguation)
 Valentini (disambiguation)